Daniele Prato (born 25 May 1991) is an Italian footballer who plays for Prima Divisione club Monza.

Career
In 2009, Prato debut in Monza first team at the age of 18 years, and became the mainstay of the midfield of Biancorossi.
At the end of the Season 2010/11, Prato suffer "a sort of excrescence" that bothers him in the kneecap. The problem is that the phenomenon may also extend to risk another knee. It 'a nuisance, unfortunately, not often, but that can affect athletes at a young age.

References

1991 births
Living people
Italian footballers
A.C. Monza players
Association football midfielders